Public Garden may refer to:

Boston Public Garden
Public Garden (EP)
Public Gardens, Hyderabad, India
Cognac Public Garden, Cognac, France
Halifax Public Gardens, Halifax, Nova Scotia, Canada
Huangpu Park, Shanghai, China, formerly known as the Public Garden

See also 
 Garden (disambiguation)
 Urban park